Proliniscus is a genus of leaf beetles in the subfamily Eumolpinae, found in Africa. Most of its species were originally placed in Liniscus (now known as Zohranus) or Syagrus.

Species
 Proliniscus antennatus (Jacoby, 1900)
 Proliniscus cylindriformis (Jacoby, 1897)
 Proliniscus dombeyae (Bryant, 1941)
 Proliniscus garambaensis Selman, 1972
 Proliniscus natalensis (Lefèvre, 1891)
 Proliniscus parvulus (Jacoby, 1899)
 Proliniscus puncticollis (Jacoby, 1900)
 Proliniscus viridis Selman, 1973

References

Eumolpinae
Chrysomelidae genera
Beetles of Africa